Random Hero may refer to:
 Random Hero (band), an American rock band formed in Denver, Colorado in 2005
 Ryan Dunn or Random Hero, American reality television personality and daredevil